D'Lites of America was an American fast food chain based in Norcross, Georgia. It was known for serving fast food with a higher emphasis on nutrition. It featured reduced-calorie dishes, including hamburgers made with lean beef, high-fiber buns, and low-calorie cheese.

It was founded in 1978 by Doug Sheley and Jeffrey Miller. The first franchises opened in 1983. By 1985, more than 100 stores were opened.

The chain stopped franchising in 1986 and closed several stores. By year's end, it had filed for Chapter 11 bankruptcy. In 1987, ninety percent of the remaining company-owned stores were sold to Hardee's and were soon rebranded as Hardee's.

According to FIU Hospitality Review, the chain's closure was due to other chains such as McDonald's, Burger King, and Wendy's beginning to offer healthier sides such as salads and baked potatoes, as well as D'Lites' buying back of several unsuccessful franchise locations.

See also

 List of defunct fast-food restaurant chains

References

Restaurants established in 1978
Companies that filed for Chapter 11 bankruptcy in 1986
Restaurants disestablished in 1987
Defunct fast-food chains in the United States
Defunct companies based in Georgia (U.S. state)
Restaurants in Georgia (U.S. state)
Fast-food franchises
1978 establishments in Georgia (U.S. state)
Defunct restaurants in the United States